This article refers to the Saginaw Gears of the IHL.  For the Saginaw Gears of the UHL, see Saginaw Gears (UHL).
The Saginaw Gears were a minor-league ice hockey franchise that played in the defunct International Hockey League (IHL). The Gears existed from 1972 to 1983.  The Gears played their home games at Wendler Arena in the Saginaw Civic Center (now known as The Dow Event Center).

IHL hockey would later return to the Tri-Cities when the Flint Generals were moved to Saginaw, Michigan to become the Saginaw Generals for the 1985–86 season.

Championships
The Gears made the playoffs for nine straight seasons, from 1973–82. The Gears reached the Turner Cup Finals five times in that stretch, and won the following championships:

Trivia
The Turner Cup replica at the Hockey Hall of Fame in Toronto has Saginaw misspelled as "Sagimaw" for the 1976-77 championship.

Notable players
The Gears sent several players to the National Hockey League in their 11-year existence. The biggest names include:
 John Gibson
 Lou Franceschetti
 Bob Froese
 Greg Hotham, whose sons Scott and Andrew played for the Saginaw Spirit
 Mario Lessard
 Mike Palmateer
 In 1974–75, longtime NHL forward/defenceman Reg Fleming joined the Gears in time for the 1975 playoffs.
 Head Coach Don Perry also made it to the NHL, coaching the Los Angeles Kings from 1981–84.
 Marcel Comeau, 1980–81 IHL's top scorer and most valuable player
 Dennis Desrosiers 10 year veteran of the Gears.  High scoring right wing / tough guy.  Color commentator of Saginaw Spirit  Decades long career as a coach

References

External links
Saginaw Gears statistics at Hockey Database

Professional ice hockey teams in Michigan
Defunct ice hockey teams in the United States
International Hockey League (1945–2001) teams
1972 establishments in Michigan
1983 disestablishments in Michigan
Ice hockey clubs established in 1972
Boston Bruins minor league affiliates